The XXIX World Rhythmic Gymnastics Championships was held in Ise, Mie, Japan, September 7–13, 2009, at the Sun Arena.

Evgenia Kanaeva from Russia, has won all possible medals in a world championship (in individual events), a historic achievement.

Programme 

 September 7
10:00 - 18:00 Competition I (Rope, Hoop)
 September 8
10:00 - 18:00 Competition I (Rope, Hoop)
18:30 – 19:00 Opening ceremony
19:00 – 19:30 Competition III Final Individual exercises Rope
19:30 – 20:00 Competition III Final Individual exercises Hoop
20:00 - 20:15 Medal Awarding Ceremony (Rope, Hoop)
 September 9
10:00 - 18:00 Competition I (Ball, Ribbon)
 September 10
10:00 - 18:00 Competition I (Ball, Ribbon)
18:30 - 19:00 Competition III Final Individuals exercises Ball
19:00 - 19:30 Competition III Final Individuals exercises Ribbon
19:30 - 19:45 Medal Awarding Ceremony (Ball, Ribbon)
19:45 - 20:00 Medal Awarding Ceremony Teams

 September 11
14:30 - 20:30 Competition II Individuals All-Around
20:30 – 20:40 Longines Prize of Elegance
20:40 - 21:00 Medal Awarding Ceremony Individuals II All-Around
 September 12
10:00 - 14:45 Competition II Groups
14:45 - 15:00 Medal Awarding Ceremony Group General
 September 13
15:00 - 15:30 Final Groups (Hoop)
15:30 - 16:00 Final Groups (Ribbon + Rope)
16:00 - 16:20 Medal Awarding Ceremony Group Hoop and Ribbon + Rope
16:20 - 17:30 Closing Ceremony and Gala

Medal winners 

* reserve gymnast

Results

Individual and team All-Around and Qualifications
The Medal Awarding Ceremony Teams was held on 10.09.2009. It included all results of the Competition I (Qualifications for individual finals), which was held from 7 to 10.09.2009.

Individual competitors
  Anzhelika Afiyan
  Naira Minasyan
  Lieselotte Diels
  Stephanie Belen Estrada
  Nika Roberta Crevatini
  Anamarija Zhelimorski
  Yasmin Rostm
  Marize Shawky Farid
  Marina Fernandez
  Carolina Rodriguez
  Delphine Ledoux
  Fanni Dalma Forray
  Dora Vass
  Lee Kyung-hwa
  Shin Soo-ji
  Jurgita Lionginaviciute
  Egle Sileikyte
  Nicole Bierbach
  Andrada Andriana Anton
  Stefania Chiriac
  Vojislava Cekerevac
  Snezana Paunic
  Jana Duchnovska
  Ava Gehringer
  Julie Zetlin

Individual Finals

All-Around

The individual All-Around was held on 11.09.2009.

Rope

The Rope final was held on 08.09.2009.

Hoop

The Hoop final was held on 08.09.2009.

Ball

The Ball final was held on 10.09.2009.

Ribbon

The Ribbon final was held on 10.09.2009.

Groups

Group compositions
  Nina Elleberger
  Stefanie Pikl
  Melissa Schmidt
  Natascha Strobel
  Lena Vertacnik
  Dina Gorina
  Jeyla Guliyeva
  Vafa Huseynova
  Anastasiya Prasolova
  Stefani Trayanova
  Valeriya Yegay
  Alesia Babushkina
  Dzina Haitsiukevich
  Maryna Hancharova
  Nastassia Ivankova
  Kseniya Sankovich
  Alina Tumilovich
  Ana Paula Alencar
  Nathane Cassia Garcia
  Jéssica Terezinha Oliveira
  Natalia Peixinho Sanchez
  Ana Paula Ribeiro
  Eleonora Kezhova
  Mihaela Maevska
  Kristina Rangelova-Yankova
  Stela Sultanova
  Galina Tancheva
  Vladislava Tancheva
  Rose Cossar
  Rylee Haubrich
  Alexandra Lukashova
  Kelsey Titmarsh
  Stefani Viinamae
  Dominika Cervinkova
  Aneta Fujdiarova
  Nataly Hamrikova
  Ludmila Korytova
  Olivia Caroline Mala
  Vendula Zamorska
  Loreto Achaerandio
  Sandra Aguilar
  Sara Garvin
  Ana Maria Pelaz
  Alejandra Quereda
  Lidia Redondo
  Carita Groenholm
  Sirja Kokkonen
  Riina Maatta
  Vanessa Martins Lopes
  Minna Puro
  Florine Dally
  Cecilia Ferrier
  Melanie Haag
  Jeanne Isenmann
  Ketty Martel
  Priscillia Thomas
  Maike Deuschle
  Johanna Gabor
  Camilla Pfeffer
  Sara Radman
  Karolina Raskina
  Afroditi Georgovasili
  Alexandra Georgovasili
  Vasiliki Maniou
  Antonia Papaioannou
  Maria Spanoudaki
  Despoina Tzimpoula
  Maria Dudinszky
  Judith Hauser
  Noemi Horcher
  Fanni Kohlhoffer
  Anna Tokes
  Daria Topic
  Olena Dvornichenko
  Maria Savenkov
  Rahel Vigdorchick
  Veronika Vitenberg
  Polina Zakaluzny
  Elisa Blanchi
  Giulia Galtarossa
  Romina Laurito
  Daniela Masseroni
  Elisa Santoni
  Anzhelika Savrayuk
  Yuka Endo
  Chihana Hara
  Saori Inagaki
  Nachi Misawa
  Kotono Tanaka
  Honami Tsuboi
  Madina Iskanderova
  Mizana Ismailova
  Ravilya Rafikova
  Dinara Serikbayeva
  Darya Shevchenko
  Dariya Simonova
  Jiseon Baek
  Yunhee Gim
  Hyejeang Ha
  Hyejin Kim
  Kyungeun Lee
  Unjin Sin
  Inga Buczynska
  Anna Gorna
  Anna Semmerling
  Aleksandra Szutenberg
  Agata Tworek
  Aleksandra Wojcik
  Uliana Donskova
  Daria Koroleva
  Ekaterina Malygina
  Anastasia Maximova
  Natalia Pichuzhkina
  Daria Shcherbakova
  Chantal Breitinger
  Capucine Jelmi
  Carol Rohatsch
  Nadine Stucki
  Lisa Tacchelli
  Souheila Yacoub
  Olena Dmytrash
  Viera Perederiy
  Oksana Petulko
  Valeria Shurkhal
  Olga Tsogla
  Vita Zubchenko
  Stephanie Flaksman
  Kristin Kaye
  Frohlich Megan
  Sofya Roytburg
  Marlee Shape
  Lyubov Dropets
  Veronika Esipova
  Ekaterina Safronova
  Inara Sattarova
  Kamila Tukhtaeva

All-Around

The Groups All-Around was held on 12.09.2009.

5 Hoops Final 

The Groups 5 Hoops Final was held on 13.09.2009.

3 Ribbons + 2 Ropes Final

The Groups 3 Ribbons + 2 Ropes Final was held on 13.09.2009.

Medal table

External links
  Official site
  Fig microsite

Rhythmic Gymnastics World Championships
Rhythmic Gymnastics Championships
R
International gymnastics competitions hosted by Japan